BRAC Bank is a private commercial bank in Bangladesh, operated by the BRAC development organisation, focused on Small and Medium Enterprises (SME). The bank has its head office in Dhaka, Bangladesh. Ahsan H. Mansur is the chairman of BRAC Bank and Selim R. F. Hussain the managing director.

History
BRAC Bank was founded on 4 July 2001 to reach the large number of unbanked people which were not covered by traditional bank. The main concept of the bank was to facilitate Small and Medium Enterprises. BRAC Bank was found by Fazle Hasan Abed, the founder of BRAC and BRAC University.

In 2005, BRAC Bank established BRAC Afghanistan Bank in 2006 as a greenfield venture.

In February 2008, the CEO and managing director of BRAC Bank, Imran Rahman, died in Canada. In May 2008, the bank decided to purchase a majority stake in GSP Finance Company (Bangladesh) Limited. Muhammad A. (Rumee) Ali was appointed chairman of BRAC Bank Limited. Muhammad A. (Rumee) Ali was a deputy governor of Bangladesh Bank and had joined BRAC in 2007.

In August 2009, BRAC Bank purchased 51 per cent of Equity Partners Limited and Equity Partners Securities Limited. They are later renamed to BRAC EPL Stock Brokerage Limited and BRAC EPL Investments Limited. BRAC Saajan Exchange Limited was established in 2011 through the purchase of Saajan Worldwide Money Transfer Limited, established in 2009, in Great Britain. BRAC Bank sponsored Wasfia Nazreen seven summit expedition.

In September 2014, a robbery took place at the Joypurhat District branch of BRAC Bank Limited. Rapid Action Battalion arrested the suspects and recovered some of the stolen money in September.

Ahsan H Mansur was appointed chairman of BRAC Bank on 27 August 2019 replacing Sir Fazle Hasan Abed after he retired. It's half yearly profit saw a 50 per cent decline.

BRAC Bank filled an appeal on 19 October 2020 with the Appellate Division seeking a stay order on a verdict of Bangladesh High Court which ordered the bank to pay 1.5 million BDT to Jaha Alam, who had served three years wrongly in case filed by BRAC.

BRAC Bank received US$30 million in April from International Finance Corporation. In August 2021, BRAC Bank planned to raise six billion BDT through issuing bonds. 

In September 2022, Bangladesh Bank ordered BRAC Bank to spend 50 per cent of their profits from Foreign Exchange trading, deemed unethical by Bangladesh Bank, on corporate social responsibility programs. On 28 September, it opened it's 800th agent banking branch. It had approved 15 per cent dividends for stock holders. It increased the salary of junior grade officers by 50 per cent. It had a total asset of 611 billion BDT as of 2022. It launched a digital loan app called Shubidha.

On 11 January 2023, BRAC Bank burrowed US$50 million from the German Investment Corporation. It donated 40 million BDT to Prime Minister Sheikh Hasina's Ashrayan-2 project. BRAC Bank opened it's 1000th agent banking outlet in February 2023.

Financial services
 SME Banking
 Retails Banking
 Card Service (Credit & Debit)
 Foreign Exchange & Related Services
 Wholesale Banking & Custodial Service
 Probashi Banking

Distribution network
 Business Region: 7
 Total Branches (Including SME SC/KB): 187
 Zonal Offices: 185
 Premium Lounges: 18
 ATMs: 375
 CDMs: 96
 SME Unit Office: 457
 Agent Banking Outlet: 481
 Remittance Delivery Point : 1800

Subsidiaries
The subsidiaries are
 BRAC EPL Investments Limited
 BRAC EPL Stock Brokerage Limited
 bKash (Mobile banking service) Limited
 BRAC Saajan Exchange Limited
 BRAC IT Services Limited
 Astha

ATM network
BRAC Bank has its own ATM network which is currently 457. In addition to this BRAC Bank is the lead arranger of OMNIBUS shared ATM network.

OMNIBUS, an association of member institutions, which will provide shared ATM and POS network facilities to banks through a neutral mother switch. OMNIBUS was formed as a result of a need for a neutral and centralized gateway. And as a result BRAC Bank took the initiative. And with BRAC Bank, Q-Cash came forward with its members to join hands to form OMNIBUS.

Cricket sponsorship
The bank is the official kit sponsor for the Bangladesh national cricket team, Under-19 cricket team, Bangladesh women cricket team for the period of 2018 to 2020, meanwhile, the organisation is the kit partner for the team since 2016 and renewed their term until January 2020

See also

 IDLC Finance Limited
 IDLC Investments Limited
 List of Banks in Bangladesh
 Bangladesh Bank

References

Banks of Bangladesh